Lewis Albert "King" Brockett (July 23, 1880 – September 19, 1960) was an American Major League Baseball pitcher. In 50 career games, he had a 13–14 record with a 3.43 earned run average. Brockett batted and threw right-handed.

External links

1880 births
1960 deaths
Major League Baseball pitchers
New York Highlanders players
Minor league baseball managers
Buffalo Bisons (minor league) players
Montreal Royals players
Newark Indians players
Baseball players from Illinois
People from White County, Illinois